Dibamus celebensis is a legless lizard endemic to Sulawesi.

References

Dibamus
Reptiles of Indonesia
Reptiles described in 1858